Wankarqucha (Quechua wankar a kind of drum, qucha lake, "drum lake", Hispanicized spelling Huancarcocha) is a  mountain in the Cordillera Central in the Andes of Peru and the name of the lake at its feet. It is situated in the Lima Region, Yauyos Province, in the districts of Colonia and Huantan.

References

Mountains of Peru
Mountains of Lima Region
Lakes of Peru
Lakes of Lima Region